The Mulock Cup is Canada's oldest continuously awarded sporting trophy.  Since 1894, it has been awarded at the University of Toronto to the winner of the Intermural/intercollege rugby, then football (originally termed Rugby-Football) champion but it is now again awarded to the rugby champion. It was instituted by William Mulock.

References

Awards established in 1894
Sports trophies and awards